Oren Yiftachel (born 1956) is an Israeli professor of political and legal geography, urban studies and urban planning at Ben-Gurion University of the Negev, in Beersheba. He holds the Lynn and Lloyd Hurst Family Chair in Urban Studies.

Life and career
Yiftachel was born in Haifa and grew up on kibbutz Matzuva.
During the 1980s and early 1990s, Yiftachel studied in Australia and Israel, specializing in urban studies and political geography. In 1990, he received a Doctor of Philosophy from the Department of Geography, the University of Western Australia, Perth, and the Faculty of Architecture and Town Planning, the Technion – Israel Institute of Technology, Haifa. He returned to Israel, where he did his post-doctoral studies on regional planning at the Technion, Haifa.

He has subsequently taught urban planning, geography, political science and Middle East departments, at various institutions, including: Curtin University, Australia; the Technion, Israel; the University of Pennsylvania, Columbia University, and UC Berkeley, in the United States; the University of Cape Town, South Africa and the University of Venice, Italy. Most recently, he was appointed as a visiting professor at RMIT University, Melbourne; and as a Leverhulme professor at University College London (Geography and the Bartlett). He was also a research fellow at the United States Institute of Peace, Washington DC; and the Van Leer Jerusalem Institute, Jerusalem.
 
Yiftachel is the founding and past editor of the journal, Hagar: Studies in Culture, Politics and Place, and has serves on the editorial board of Planning Theory, IJMES, MERIP, Urban Studies, Journal of Planning Literature, Environment and Planning A, and Territory, Politics, Governance.

Yiftachel has worked as an urban and regional planner in a range of institutions, including the Perth City Council in Australia, the Kibbutz Movement and "Israel 2020" project in Israel. He specialized in advocacy planning and land consultancy. Recently he has worked on an Israeli-Palestinian plan for a bi-national Jerusalem, an alternative plan for the unrecognized Bedouin villages in southern Israel, and a plan for a multicultural Beersheba. Yiftachel has worked as an urban and regional planner in a range of institutions, including the Perth City Council, the Kibbutz Movement, and "Israel 2020" project in Israel.

Yiftachel is also an activist, and has been a member of several notable organizations, including Faculty for Israel-Palestine Peace (FFIPP), PALISAD, The Negev Coexistence Forum, Adva (centre for social equality), and Habitat International Coalition. In recent years Yiftachel served as a board member and chair of B'tselem – the Israeli Information Center for Human Rights in the Occupied Territories; and has co-founded a new Israeli-Palestinian peace movement – "A Land for All - Two States, One Homeland". For many years he has worked as planner and advocate with the indigenous Bedouin populations in the Negev/Naqab and other regions. He is an occasional op-ed contributor to leading Israeli newspapers, including Haaretz, Ynet and Ma'ariv. A member of Academia for Equality, an organization working to promote democratization, equality and access to higher education for all communities living in Israel.

Scholarship
Yiftachel has been a leading researcher drawing worldwide attention. During the last decade he has been the most highly cited Israeli scholar in geography and urban studies. A special issue of an international journal was recently devoted to the theory of ethnocratic regimes, two decades after their formulation by Yiftachel.

Yiftachel's works develop critical perspectives of space and power; minorities and public policy; 'ethnocratic' societies and land regimes. His early scholarship in urban and planning studies focused on Australian metropolitan planning and its impact on 'urban social sustainability'. He later developed a theory of the 'dark side' of urban planning and has contributed to opening up planning theory to critical theory in general, and to issues of identity, colonization and space in particular.

In recent years he has developed a theory of gray space and 'displaceability' as underlining condition of new urban regimes and citizenship. In parallel, he developed with colleagues a model of 'doing the just city' as a theoretical and professional alternative. In political geography, his work formulated the concept of 'ethnocratic' regimes, which has generated debates in ethnic and racial studies, regime theories and research in Israel/Palestine. His comparative work has focused on comparatively analyzing spatial policy towards minorities in a range of 'ethnocratic' states and cities, most particularly Australia, Sri Lanka, Estonia, Cyprus, Bosnia, Northern Ireland and South Africa. In recent years Yiftachel has worked on the political and legal geography of indigenous peoples, focusing on Bedouins in Israel/Palestine in a comparative framework, as well as on concepts such as 'gray spacing', 'mtrozenship' and 'urban displaceability' which he developed during the last decade.

In a series of books and articles, Yiftachel explores comparatively the types of regimes that typically develop under condition of ethnic conflict. In this framework, He conceptualizes the Israeli regime as an ethnocracy, promoting a dominant project of 'ethnicization' throughout Israel/Palestine, in which ethnicity dominates citizenship.[3] He documents the various practices of this project, and the manner in which it has constructed ethno-class identities and stratified citizenship through the process of expansion, development, projects of Judaisation and politicization in the different regions of Israel/Palestine.[4] His model traces the nature of the Zionist project, taking into account the historical circumstances spawning Jewish 'colonization of refugees'. His early work also focused on the tension between liberal and ethnocratic-religious components of the Israeli regime, and on the privileged status given European over Eastern Jews established during the settlement project, but also the  recent closing of the gaps through on-going colonization of Palestinian lands.

Palestinians are relegated to the status of 'unwanted' indigenous peoples resisting the ethnocratic project.[3] Yiftachel uses a multidisciplinary approach, inspired by Neo-Gramscian thinking and by a range of Marxian, post- and neo-colonial theorists. In the study of Israel/Palestine he was one of the first to break the traditional scholarly divisions between analysis of Arab-Jewish relations and internal Jewish dynamics, and one of a handful of scholars to question whether Israel acts as a democratic state within the Green Line (Israeli pre-1967 borders). The Israeli regime, according to Yiftachel, has presided over the entire historic Palestine for over five decades, and should be analyzed according to the power structures he claims it imposed over the entire territory. Yiftachel developed the 'settler-ethnocratic' model to highlight the regime's main historical-material logic, and the concept of 'creeping apartheid' to describe its recent manifestation and the development of four different 'separate and unequal' types of citizenship under the Israeli regime..

Yiftachel's work is rich in conceptualization, with development of a conceptual architecture including terms such as 'trapped minorities', 'fractured regions', 'ruptured demos', 'internal frontiers', 'frontiphery', 'gray spacing' and 'displaceability'. His recent work also develops a 'South-Eastern' perspective  by providing alternative conceptualizations to the dominant theories and discourses generated by American and European academic centers.

Publications
Yiftachel has published over 120 articles and chapters. Among his books, edited collections, and monographs:

Author (books)

 Yiftachel, O. (1992). Planning a Mixed Region in Israel: The Political Geography of Arab-Jewish Relations in the Galilee, Avebury, Gower Publishing Limited, Aldershot, Hampshire, UK, 376pp, 44 maps and figures, 39 tables, 13 plates. .
 Yiftachel, O. (1995). Planning as Control: Policy and Resistance in Deeply Divided Societies, Progress in Planning Series, Vol. 44, Pergamon-Elsvier, Oxford, UK, 89 pages, 9 figures, 4 tables, .
 Yiftachel, O. (1997). Guardians of the Vineyard: Majd al-Krum as Fable, The Institute for Israeli Arab Studies (The 'Seam-line Series'), Beit Berl; 126 pp., 7 maps and figures, 6 tables,  (Hebrew).
 Yiftachel, O. (2006). Ethnocracy: Land, and the Politics of Identity Israel/Palestine (PennPress - the University of Pennsylvania Press, 306 pp. 26 figures, 4 tables; translated to five languages). 
 Kedar, S.; Amara, A.; & Yiftachel, O. (2018). Emptied Lands: Legal Geography of Bedouin Rights in the Negev, Stanford: Stanford University Press.

Editor (books)

 Hedgcock, D., & Yiftachel, O., eds. (1992). Urban and Regional Planning in Western Australia: Historical and Critical Perspectives, Paradigm Press, Perth, 306pp, 34 maps and figures, 
 Yiftachel, O., & Meir, A., eds. (1998). Ethnic Frontiers in Israel: Landscapes of Development and Inequality in Israel, Boulder, Westview Press, 337 pages, 18 tables, 25 maps and figures, .
 Yiftachel, O.; Alexander, I.; Hedgcock, D.; & Little, J., eds. (2001). The Power of Planning: Spaces of Control and Transformation, Kluwer Academic Publications, the Hague; ISBN, 214 pp.; 6 tables, 17 figures). .
 Kemp, A., Yiftachel, O., Newman, D., Ram, U., eds. (2004). Hegemonies and Resistance: Israelis in Conflict, (280 pp., 4 tables, 11 figures; Sussex Academic Press) .
 Amara, A., Yiftachel, O. & Abu-Saad, I. (eds), (2013). Indigenous (In)Justice? Human Rights among Bedouins in Southern Israel/Palestine, Cambridge, Massachusetts, Harvard University Press.

Editor (special issues)

 Yiftachel, O.; & Abu-Saad, I., eds. (2008). "Bedouin-Arabs Society in the Negev", Special theme issue of Hagar: Studies in Culture, Politics and Identity, Vol. 8. 257pp, 16 tables, 13 figures, 52 photographs).
 Ghanem, A. & Yiftachel, O., eds. (2010). "The Vision Documents: a New Order for Arab-Jewish Relations in Israel?", Special theme issue of State and Society, 165 pp, 3 figures, 4 table (Hebrew).
 Yiftachel, O. & Mandelbaum, R., eds. (2015). "Social Justice and Israel Planning", Special Issue of Planning – Journal of the Israeli Planning Association, Vol. 12, No. 1: 145-270.
 Yiftachel, O. & Porter, L., eds. (2019). "Settler Colonialism, Indigeneity and the City", special issue of Settler Colonial Studies'', Vol. 8

References

External links
 Recent publications 
 Personal homepage 

1956 births
Academic staff of Ben-Gurion University of the Negev
Columbia University faculty
Israeli geographers
Living people
Political geographers
Israeli urban planners
B'Tselem people
People from Haifa
University of Western Australia alumni
Technion – Israel Institute of Technology alumni